Un amore di strega was an Italian TV movie from 2009, in which Alessia Marcuzzi, Pietro Sermonti, Anna Galiena and Luca Ward were the main cast.

Plot

On her 30th birthday Carlotta, an organizer of weddings, discovers that her boyfriend is having an affair. Depressed, she doesn't realize that she received magical powers as a gift from her father, who she believed was dead. She discovered the possession only when she met the charming Ricardo Valenti, the manager that the mother has hired to save the business from bankruptcy. The two become a couple, but the sudden discovery of Carlotta's powers pushes Ricardo to marry his former girlfriend. It's up to Emma and Vlad, Carlotta's magical parents, stop it before it's too late.

Broadcasting
The movie made its premiere in the Italian TV channel Canale 5 on April 29, 2009.

See also
 List of films about witchcraft

References

External links
 

2009 television films
2009 films
Italian television films
2000s Italian-language films
Films about witchcraft
2000s Italian films